Joseph S. Clark Sr. High School was a high school in Tremé, New Orleans, Louisiana. Clark opened in 1947 as the first high school below Canal Street to educate colored children in New Orleans. It was named after Joseph S. Clark, the first president of the Southern University at Baton Rouge. The Rebirth Brass Band was formed at the high school in 1983. The high school was operated by the charter Firstline Schools at its closing in 2019.

Notable alumni
Keith Frazier, musician
Shirley & Lee, American musical duo
Oretha Castle Haley, civil rights activist
Michael Haynes, American football wide receiver
Derrick Lewis, American football wide receiver
Fred Luter, former president of the Southern Baptist Convention
Mannie Fresh, American rapper, record producer and DJ
Mia X, American rapper, singer-songwriter and actress
Rebirth Brass Band, New Orleans brass band
Al Richardson, American football defensive end
Kermit Ruffins, trumpeter
Roosevelt "Rosey" Taylor, American football all-pro safety
Oliver Thomas, Democratic politician
Monk Williams, American football player

References

External links

Joseph S. Clark Preparatory High School

Defunct charter schools in New Orleans
Defunct public high schools in New Orleans
Educational institutions established in 2016
Educational institutions disestablished in 2019
2016 establishments in Louisiana
2019 disestablishments in Louisiana
Tremé